Carters Creek is a stream in Maury and Williamson counties, Tennessee, in the United States. There was a Civil War engagement there on Monday, April 27, 1863, in which 128 rebels were captured by Union Cavalry.

Carters Creek was named for Capt. Benjamin Carter, a pioneer.

See also
List of rivers of Tennessee

References

Rivers of Maury County, Tennessee
Rivers of Williamson County, Tennessee
Rivers of Tennessee
Battles of the American Civil War in Tennessee